This is a summary of the electoral history of Keith Holyoake, Prime Minister of New Zealand (1957, 1960–72), Leader of the National Party (1957–72), and Member of Parliament for  (1932–38) then  (1943–77).

Parliamentary elections

1931 election

1932 by-election

1935 election

1938 election

1943 election

1946 election

1949 election

1951 election

1954 election

1957 election

1960 election

1963 election

1966 election

1969 election

1972 election

1975 election

Notes

References

Holyoake, Keith